Timelines: Assault on America is a real-time strategy game set in an alternate history World War II, developed by Hungarian studio 4Flash Interactive. The game was released for Microsoft Windows, OS X, and Linux, and for iOS and Android on February 17, 2015.

Plot 
On July 20, 1942, the United States’ Office of Strategic Services (OSS) takes advantage of information provided to them by the underground German Resistance against the Third Reich. The OSS launch Operation ‘Wolf’s Head’, where top marksmen hide among a rally given in honor of Adolf Hitler in Berlin, Germany, assassinating him there. The OSS also sabotages multiple planes carrying high ranking Nazi officials. Afterwards, control of the Third Reich is turned over to various Nazi generals. After multiple interrogations of German Resistance members, the Nazis find out about Operation Wolf's Head. In response, they put aside their secret plans to invade the Soviet Union, and instead extend the non-aggression pact with them. Germany then conspires with the Empire of Japan to mount an amphibious two front invasion of the United States. After a successful German invasion of Cuba, as well heavy naval build-up in the Pacific by Japan, the Axis powers begin their invasion of the U.S.

Gameplay 
The game featured conventional campaign style missions and multiplayer functionality. The game also featured learning Artificial Intelligence, internationalization and localization, and cross-platform compatibility.

Development 

The game was built on the Horde3D graphics engine and GLFW on desktop platforms.

Reception 
The game generally received mixed industry, media, and consumer attention, Softpedia rated the game 6/10 citing controller issues and RTS mechanics flaws. ActionRadius gave the game a low rating citing a lack of intuitive user interface and a lack of strategic depth. WW2 Games HQ rated the game 7/10. Strategy First ran several promotions for the game including free additional content.

References

External links 
 
 

2013 video games
Real-time strategy video games
Real-time tactics video games
Windows games
MacOS games
Linux games
IOS games
Android (operating system) games
Video games about World War II alternate histories
World War II video games
Strategy First games
Video games developed in Hungary
Video games set in the United States
War video games set in the United States
Video games set in Washington, D.C.
Fiction about invasions
Video games set in 1944